Majorganj (community development block) is an administrative division  in Sitamarhi district in the Indian state of Bihar.It is a town more than 200 years old. It has been mentioned in the District Gazetteer of Muzzafurpur "page no.23",that during the Anglo- Gurkha war of 1814, A British battalion was stationed there and Captain Blackney who was killed at samanpur (in now sitamarhi District) during a Gurkha ambush, is buried at Majorganj cemetery. He died on 1 January 1815.

Geography
Majorganj is located at  Majorganj block area ends with border of Nepal. It is a developing market place and most of the revenue of this market comes from retail customers of Nepal.

Panchayats
Panchayats in Majorganj community development block are: Ratanpur, Basbitta, Pachharwa, Bahera, Kuari Madan, Mejorganj, Khairwa and Dumri Kala.

Demographics
As per 2001 census, Majoganj block had a population of 80,195.

See also
 Majorganj (Vidhan Sabha constituency)

References

Community development blocks in Sitamarhi district